Gualtiero Driussi (18 October 1920 – 24 March 1996) was an Italian politician and syndicalist, member of Italy's centrist party Christian Democracy and of the Italian Chamber of Deputies and founder of the first trade union in Udine, a branch of the Italian Confederation of Workers' Trade Unions.

External links
 Some information about life
 Page about Driussi on the Italian Chamber of Deputies' website
 Page about Driussi on the Italian Chamber of Deputies' website

1920 births
1996 deaths
Politicians from Trieste
Christian Democracy (Italy) politicians
Deputies of Legislature I of Italy
Deputies of Legislature II of Italy